James W. H. Brown (December 12, 1860 – April 6, 1908) was an American Major League Baseball pitcher and outfielder for two seasons, 1884 and 1886.  In 1884, he played for the Altoona Mountain City and St. Paul Saints, both of the Union Association, and played in one game for the New York Gothams of the National League.  Two years later, in 1886, he played in one game for the Philadelphia Athletics of the American Association.

In 19 games as a starting pitcher, Brown won 2, lost 15, and pitched 13 complete games.  His earned run average was 4.74.  He also made some appearances in the outfield and one at first base, giving him a total of 29 games played at the major league level.  He batted .245 (27-for-110) with 17 runs scored.

A native of Clinton County, Pennsylvania, he died at the age of 47 in Williamsport, Pennsylvania, and is interred at Highland Cemetery in Lock Haven, Pennsylvania.

References

External links

Major League Baseball pitchers
Major League Baseball outfielders
Altoona Mountain Citys players
New York Gothams players
Philadelphia Athletics (AA) players
St. Paul Saints (UA) players
19th-century baseball players
Baseball players from Pennsylvania
People from Clinton County, Pennsylvania
1860 births
1908 deaths
Altoona (minor league baseball) players
Williamsport (minor league baseball) players
Augusta Browns players
Lincoln Tree Planters players
Hastings Hustlers players